Campostrecha is a monotypic genus of ammotrechid camel spiders, first described by Cândido Firmino de Mello-Leitão in 1937. Its single species, Campostrecha felisdens is distributed in Ecuador.

References 

Solifugae
Arachnid genera
Monotypic arachnid genera